The ranks in the Chinese People's Liberation Army Navy are similar to those of the People's Liberation Army Ground Force, except that those of the PLA Navy are prefixed by 海军 (Hai Jun) meaning Naval Force or Navy.  See Ranks of the People's Liberation Army or the article on an individual rank for details on the evolution of rank and insignia in the PLAN.  This article primarily covers the existing ranks and insignia.

From 1956 to 1965, similar insignia were used following the Soviet model, but unlike the Ground and Air Forces, PLAN ratings used shoulder boards for rank insignia. Line corps officers wore gold and blue shoulder boards on the dress uniform, staff corps officers white and blue. The duty uniform boards were a reverse of the dress uniform boards.

Current ranks

Officer ranks
The current system of officer ranks and insignia dates from 1988 and is a revision of the ranks and insignia used from 1955 to 1965. The rank of Hai Jun Yi Ji Shang Jiang (First Class Admiral) was never held and was abolished in 1994. With the official introduction of the Type 07 uniforms all officer insignia are on either shoulders or sleeves depending on the type of uniform used.

Enlisted and non-commissioned rates
The current system of enlisted ratings and their corresponding insignia dates from 2009.

Unlike NATO countries, new recruits of the People's Liberation Army have no military ranks before the boot camp is completed, and they will be awarded the rank of Private/Seaman Apprentice/Airman (All collectively called "Private" or "Lie Bing" in the Chinese Language) after they have graduated from the boot camp. According to Article 16 of Chapter 3 of the "Regulations on the Service of Active Soldiers of the Chinese People's Liberation Army", "The lowest enlisted rank is Private".

Historical ranks

Type 55 (Line corps)

Officers

Enlisted and non-commissioned rates

See also 
 Republic of China Navy rank and rating insignia

References

External links 
Naval Uniforms of the People's Liberation Army Navy
Military ranks of the People's Liberation Army Navy

Military ranks of the People's Republic of China
People's Liberation Army Navy personnel
People's Liberation Army Navy